Mary Barnett may refer to:

Mary Angela Barnett (born 1949), birth name of Angie Bowie, model
Dame Mary Henrietta Barnett (1905–1985), Director of Women's Royal Air Force
Mary Barnett in Dartford Borough Council election, 2011